Jack Callahan may refer to:

Jack Callahan (cartoonist) (1888–1954)
Jack Callahan (Neighbours), fictional character on the Australian soap opera Neighbours
Jack Callahan (coach), head coach of Old Dominion Monarchs baseball and basketball (1947–1948)
Jack Callahan (musician)

See also
Jack O'Callahan, retired American hockey player
John Callahan (disambiguation)